Snowbound may refer to:

Music 

Snowbound (Fourplay album)
Snowbound (Sarah Vaughan album)
"Snowbound" (song), a 1993 song by Donald Fagen from Kamakiriad
"Snowbound", a song by Genesis from ...And Then There Were Three...
"Snowbound", a song by Arch Enemy from Wages of Sin

Film and television 
Snowbound (1927 film), a film starring Betty Blythe
Snowbound (1948 film), a film starring Stanley Holloway and Dennis Price
Snowbound: The Jim and Jennifer Stolpa Story, a 1994 television movie
Snowbound (2001 film), a film starring Erika Eleniak, Monika Schnarre, and Peter Dobson

Literature 

Snow-Bound, an 1866 long narrative poem by John Greenleaf Whittier
Snowbound: The Record of a Theatrical Touring Party, a 1908 collection of short stories by Bram Stoker
Snowbound, a novel in The Baby-sitters Club series
Snowbound, a novel in the Nancy Drew on Campus series

Other uses 

Snowbound, an experimental theatre show starring Alice Lowe
Snowbound (horse), a horse ridden by William Steinkraus at the 1968 Summer Olympics